Narducci is an Italian surname. Notable people with the surname include:

 Francesco Narducci, a wealthy Perugian doctor, drowned in Lake Trasimeno in 1985, investigated with the Monster of Florence
 Kathrine Narducci (born 1965), American actress
 L. M. Narducci (1942–2006), Italian-American physicist
 Massimiliano Narducci (born 1964), Italian tennis player
 Roberto Narducci (1887–1979), Italian architect and engineer

See also
 Nardući, village in Croatia

Italian-language surnames